The Safe Meat and Poultry Inspection Panel is an advisory panel to review and evaluate meat inspection policies and proposed changes that the 1996 farm bill (P.L. 104–127, Sec. 918) permanently authorized by amendment to the federal meat and poultry inspection statutes. Provisions in annual USDA appropriations laws since 1996 have prohibited the department from actually establishing the advisory panel.

References 

United States Department of Agriculture
Poultry farming in the United States
Meat inspection
Veterinary medicine in the United States